Jacinto Quirarte (August 17, 1931 - July 20, 2012) was an art historian, professor, scholar and writer who was instrumental in documenting and promoting Latino and Chicano art in the United States. Quirarte was an "expert in pre-Columbian and Latin American art history." He was one of the first to insist that pre-Columbian art and Latino art become part of the mainstream American art history narrative. He wrote many papers, monographs and several books on the subject of both ancient and modern art in the United States, Mexico, Central and South America. He is one of the founding deans of the University of Texas at San Antonio (UTSA). Quirarte was also one of the first Mexican-American scholars to work at the university level.

Biography 
Quirarte was born during the Great Depression, in Jerome, a small mining town in Arizona. His father, Francisco, was originally from a town outside of Guadalajara, Jalisco. His mother, Frutosa, was born in Jerome, and her family had come from the same area of Jalisco. Quirarte's family lived in the part of town in Jerome known as El Barrio Mexicano or sometimes El Barrio Chicano. He didn't learn to speak English until he started school. He enjoyed his studies from an early age and began drawing Arizona landscapes as a young child.

Quirarte moved with his family to San Francisco at age 16. They eventually settled into the Mission District where he attended Mission High School. In high school, he took many challenging courses, especially in critical writing in English. He also played varsity basketball for Mission High School. Even though Quirarte excelled at sports, he felt that art was the direction he wanted to go in for a career.

Quirarte attended San Francisco State University (SFSU) where he got his BA. During his time there, he studied with artist, John Gutmann, learning art history, photography and life drawing. Between working towards his bachelor's degree and Master's, which he also received from SFSU, Quirarte served in the Korean War in the United States Air Force where he was a first lieutenant and a navigator. He was part of a bomber squadron from 1954 to 1957.

In 1954, Quirarte met his wife, Sara Bel Farmer, when he was at navigator training in Harlingen, Texas. They married within two months of meeting one another. Sara had worked as a model in New York and was a student at the University of Texas. Quirarte and Sara honeymooned in Mexico after their marriage in December.

Quirarte went back to SFSU and pursued a masters after leaving the Air Force. He took art history classes and aesthetics. One big reason that Quirarte chose not to become an artist was because he didn't like the dominant art form of the time, Abstract Expressionism. Quirarte felt that he would have had to work in that school of art to be successful and he preferred figurative art. His Masters thesis was on Mayan painting and Gutmann was a big help to Quirarte as he worked towards his thesis.

After working on his thesis, Quirarte used his GI Bill to pursue a Ph.D. in art history. Quirarte and his wife, Sara, went to Mexico where he attended the National Autonomous University of Mexico. He became "steeped in the artistic traditions of Central and South America" during his time there. Quirarte became an assistant to Alberto Ruz Lhuillier, a famous archaeologist who studied the Ancient Maya. Quirarte studied under Justino Fernández, an important art historian, during his time in Mexico as well.

Academic career and authorship

Quirarte taught at many places before and during his eventual settling into his career at UTSA. He taught at the University of Texas at Austin, Colegio Americano in Mexico City, University of the Americas in Mexico City and Yale University. He was a visiting professor at the University of California at Santa Barbara, University of New Mexico at Albuquerque and the American University of London.

Quirarte worked for two years as a cultural affairs representative for the United States Embassy in Caracas, Venezuela. During this time, he was part of a cultural exchange program which helped bring pop art to South America.

In the early 1970s, Quirarte, along with his wife, Sara, interviewed Mexican Artists from around the United States, driving cross-country from San Antonio to New York and then back west to California. He interviewed as many Chicano or Mexican-American artists as he was able to find through networking in order to give a scholarly approach to Chicano art. Much of Quirarte's interest in Chicano art was because of its use of pre-Columbian iconography. The interviews he took during this trip became the basis of his important book, Mexican American Artists. Most of the interviews were taken in 1970. This book was important to many Chicanos and especially Chicano artists because it "gave a reality--a documented reality--to the idea--or concept--of Chicano art."

Quirarte started working for UTSA in 1972 when he was recruited by educator, Tomás Rivera. He was one of the founding deans of UTSA and was in charge of what was then called the College of Arts. He laid much of "the groundwork" for modern programs at UTSA. He retired from UTSA in 1999, but continued teaching until 2008.

Because Quirarte was an expert on pre-Columbian and Latino art, he served on many committees. President Gerald Ford appointed Quirarte to be one of twenty-five people appointed to the American Revolution Bicentennial Advisory Council. Quirarte served as the chair for the National Task Force on Hispanic Art for the National Endowment for the Arts (NEA) from 1982 to 1987. Quirarte was a founding member and first president of the Association of Latin American Art.

Quirarte died in Helotes, Texas on July 20, 2012.

Selected bibliography

Quotes 
"This is a roundabout way of saying how important I think education is for Hispanics and everyone else. It provides the necessary insights--analytical tools--which enable all of us to grow personally as well as professionally. In addition, in my work as a scholar, I find that I would simply be unable to survive without library resources. Such materials are crucial to my work."

References

External links 
 Mexican American Artists—read an excerpt from the book including the introduction, chapters 4-8
 Jóse Montoya: Art from the Barrio—Quirarte is the interviewer in this video.
 A Guide to the Jacinto Quirarte Papers, University of Texas at San Antonio Libraries (UTSA Libraries) Special Collections.

1931 births
2012 deaths
Chicano
United States Air Force personnel of the Korean War
University of Texas at San Antonio people
American art historians
American people of Mexican descent
United States Air Force officers